An information society is a society in which the manipulation of information is a significant and sometimes measured amount of personal activity.

Information society may also refer to:
 Information Society (band), a synth-pop band
 Information Society (album), the band's first album
 The Information Society, a journal
 The IEEE Information Theory Society, a group for professionals studying information theory